Lauter is a river of Hesse, Germany. At its confluence with the Altefeld in Bad Salzschlirf, the Schlitz is formed.

See also
List of rivers of Hesse

References

Rivers of Hesse
Rivers of the Vogelsberg
Rivers of Germany